Associazione Sportiva Ostia Mare Lido Calcio is an Italian association football club located in Ostia, a frazione of Rome, Lazio. It currently plays in Serie D.

History 
Although a company that represented what was still a village already existed in 1923 as Associazione Sportiva Ostia, the Associazione Sportiva Ostia Mare Lido Calcio officially by that name existed since 1945. It played for many years in the minor leagues until 1983 when it was in the championship of Prima Categoria (then the second-level football on a regional basis), did not buy a sports title of another company by granting access to Serie D.

In the late eighties, the team reached the top step of its history in Serie C2 landing, managing to maintain in the category for two seasons (1989-90/1990-1991 championships). The reason for the golden era of those years is due to the influence and the indirect financing of AS Roma, which was looking promising young players from Ostiamare to enhance its team (during the presidency of the Rome of the late Dino Viola). Still held a tournament in the province of Rome, which recalls the former president for his commitment to the growth of companies in the town of Rome.

In recent years, after a few swings with the greatest regional championships (Promozione and Eccellenza), Ostiamare is proving to be an average of Serie D and not to have a structure suitable for football to hope in a short time in the big jump.

In the 2007–2008 season the company has dropped directly (without going through the playout) in Eccellenza. At the end of the 2008–2009 season, in Eccellenza Lazio/A, it was saved by finishing in 9th place in the standings. Didn't devote great satisfaction even the next two seasons which saw the team finishing in mid-table and never fight for the summit.

Significantly different was the 2011–2012 season, in which Ostiamare gained promotion to Serie D after four years of absence.

Colors and badge 
Its colors are white and purple.

References

External links 
 Official homepage
 A.S. Ostia Mare Lido Calcio on YouTube

Football clubs in Italy
Ostia (Rome)
Association football clubs established in 1945
Serie C clubs
1945 establishments in Italy
Football clubs in Rome